The Agriculture Information Service is a Bangladesh government agency under the Ministry of Agriculture responsible for proving information on modern agricultural methods to farmers in Bangladesh. Md. Nurul Islam is the director of the agency.

History
The Agriculture Information Service traces its origin to the Agriculture Information Agency which was founded in 1965. In 1985, the Government of Bangladesh re-organized the Agriculture Information Agency into the Agriculture Information Service. The agency publishes two journals, Krishikotha and Samprosharon Barta. It also produces Mati-O-Manush and Banglar Krishi programs on Bangladesh Television. The agency also produces programs for Bangladesh Betar and community radios. It operates a call center were farmers can call for information on agriculture.

References

1985 establishments in Bangladesh
Organisations based in Dhaka
Government agencies of Bangladesh
Agriculture in Bangladesh